The women's 1500 metres event at the 1975 Pan American Games was held in Mexico City on 19 October.
 It was the first time that this event was contested by women at the Games.

Results

References

Athletics at the 1975 Pan American Games
1975